John Michael Church (born November 4, 1986) is an American professional baseball pitcher.  He played for the United States national baseball team at the 2015 WBSC Premier12.

Church attended Lake Wales High School in Lake Wales, Florida, and the University of West Florida, where he played college football for the West Florida Argonauts. The New York Mets selected Church in the 23rd round of the 2009 MLB draft. He reached Class AAA, the highest level of Minor League Baseball, in 2013 and 2014. He played for the United States national baseball team in the 2015 WBSC Premier 12.

References

External links

Living people
1991 births
United States national baseball team players
Baseball players from Florida
Sportspeople from Winter Haven, Florida
Baseball pitchers
West Florida Argonauts baseball players